Pablo Salinas Herrera (born 3 June 1994) is a Chilean chess player. He was awarded the Grandmaster title by FIDE in 2019.

Career
Salinas has won the Chilean Chess Championship four times; in 2011, 2012, 2019 and 2021.

He has represented Chile in the Chess Olympiad three times; in 2012 (scoring 3/8 on board 4), 2014 (5/7 on board 5) and 2018 (5.5/10 on board three).

Salinas earned the Chilean federation spot to qualify for the Chess World Cup 2021, where he defeated Mads Andersen 1½-½ in the first round, and was defeated by the same score by Peter Svidler in the second round.

References

External links
 
 
 Pablo Salinas Herrera chess games at 365Chess.com

1994 births
Living people
Chilean chess players
Chess grandmasters
Chess Olympiad competitors
Place of birth missing (living people)